The 2021–22 season was Tottenham Hotspur's 30th season in the Premier League, 44th successive season in the top division of the English football league system and 116th season in existence. After finishing in seventh place in the 2020–21 Premier League, Tottenham qualified for the play-off round of the newly formed UEFA Europa Conference League. At the end of June, Tottenham announced Nuno Espírito Santo as the new head coach on a two-year contract. Tottenham announced on 1 November 2021 that they had removed Nuno Espírito Santo along with his coaching staff Ian Cathro, Rui Barbosa and Antonio Dias stating they had "been relieved of their duties." Antonio Conte was appointed as Espírito Santo's successor the following day.

Season squad

Transfers

Released 

Note: Players will join other clubs after being released or terminated from their contract. Only the following clubs are mentioned when that club signed the player in the same transfer window.

Loans in

Loans out

Transfers in

Transfers out

Overall transfer activity

Expenditure 
Summer:  £47,400,000

Winter:  £15,860,000

Total:  £63,260,000

Income 
Summer:  £16,000,000

Winter:  £0

Total:  £16,000,000

Net totals 
Summer:  £31,400,000

Winter:  £15,860,000

Total:  £47,260,000

Pre-season and friendlies 
Tottenham scheduled an away match against Leyton Orient for the JE3 Foundation Trophy in memory of Justin Edinburgh. Tottenham then scheduled two friendlies, one away to Colchester United, and one away to Milton Keynes Dons. Tottenham announced the club would come together with both Arsenal and Chelsea to support mental health in The Mind Series in August 2021. They would play away to Chelsea and home to Arsenal.

Competitions

Overview

Premier League

League table

Results summary

Results by matchday

Matches 
The league fixtures were announced on 16 June 2021.

FA Cup 

Tottenham were drawn home to Morecambe in the third round and Brighton & Hove Albion in the fourth round, and were drawn away to Middlesbrough in the fifth round.

EFL Cup 

Tottenham entered the competition in the third round as one of the teams competing in UEFA competitions. They were drawn away to Wolverhampton Wanderers in the third round and Burnley in the fourth round. They were drawn home to West Ham United in the quarter-finals. They were drawn to Chelsea in the semi-finals, with the first leg away and the second leg home.

UEFA Europa Conference League

Play-off round 
Tottenham were drawn against Paços de Ferreira in the play-off round, with the first leg away and the second leg home.

Group stage 

The draw for the group stage was held on 27 August 2021 with the fixtures being released a day later.

Statistics

Appearances

Goalscorers 

The list is sorted by shirt number when total goals are equal.

Hat-tricks

Own goals

Disciplinary 
The list is sorted by shirt number when total cards are equal.

Clean sheets 
The list is sorted by shirt number when total clean sheets are equal.

See also 
 2021–22 in English football
 List of Tottenham Hotspur F.C. seasons

References 

Tottenham Hotspur F.C. seasons
Tottenham Hotspur
2021–22 UEFA Europa Conference League participants seasons
Tottenham Hotspur
Tottenham Hotspur